Georgios Papandreou ( Geórgios Papandréou; 13 February 1888 – 1 November 1968) was a Greek politician, the founder of the Papandreou political dynasty. He served three terms as prime minister of Greece (1944–1945, 1963, 1964–1965). He was also deputy prime minister from 1950 to 1952, in the governments of Nikolaos Plastiras and Sofoklis Venizelos. He served numerous times as a cabinet minister, starting in 1923, in a political career that spanned more than five decades.

Early life
Papandreou was born at Kalentzi, in the Achaea region of the northern Peloponnese. He was the son of Father Andreas Stavropoulos, an Orthodox archpriest (protopresvyteros). His last name is derived from his father's Christian name and the word papas "priest". He studied law in Athens and political science in Berlin. His political philosophy was heavily influenced by German social democracy. As a result, he was adamantly opposed to the monarchy and supported generous social policies, but he was also extremely anti-communist (and specifically against the KKE's policies in Greece). As a young man, he became involved in politics as a supporter of the Liberal leader Eleftherios Venizelos, who made him governor of Chios after the Balkan Wars. One of his brothers, Nikos, was killed in the Battle of Kilkis-Lachanas.

He married twice. His first wife was Sofia Mineyko, a Polish national, daughter of Zygmunt Mineyko and paternal granddaughter of Stanislaw Mineyko (1802–1857). Their son Andreas Papandreou was born in Chios in 1919. His second wife was the actress Cybele Andrianou and their son was named George Papandreou.

Political career
During the political crisis surrounding Greece's entry into the First World War, Papandreou was one of Venizelos's closest supporters against the pro-German monarch, King Konstantínos I. When Venizelos in 1916 left Athens, Papandreou accompanied him to Crete, and then went to Lesbos, where he mobilised anti-monarchist supporters in the islands and rallied support for Venizelos's insurgent pro-Allied government in Thessaloniki.

In the 1920 general election, Papandreou unsuccessfully ran as an independent liberal in the Lesbos constituency. In 1921 as a lawyer he defended Alexandros Papanastasiou, during a trial for his critic against King Konstantínos. Because of an article calling on King Konstantínos to abdicate, he was imprisoned by the royalist regime and later he narrowly escaped assassination from royalist extremists in Lesbos.

From January to October 1923, he served as interior minister in the cabinet of Stylianos Gonatas. In the December 1923 elections, he was elected as a Venizelist Liberal Party member of parliament for Lésvos, and served as finance minister for just 11 days in June 1925, education minister in 1930–1932 and transport minister in 1933. As minister of education he reformed the Greek school system and built many schools for the children of refugees of the Greco-Turkish War. During the dictatorship of Pangalos, he was again imprisoned.

In 1935, he set up the Democratic Socialist Party of Greece. The same year, a royalist coup by General Geórgios Kondylis took place for the re-establishment of monarchy and he was placed in internal exile. A lifelong opponent of the Greek monarchy, he was again exiled in 1938 by the Greek royalist dictator Ioannis Metaxas.

Following the Axis occupation of Greece in the Second World War, he was imprisoned by the Italian authorities. He later fled to the Middle East and joined the predominantly Venizelist government-in-exile based in the Kingdom of Egypt. With British support, King Geórgios II appointed him as Prime Minister, and under his premiership took place the Lebanon conference (May 1944) and later the Caserta Agreement (September 1944), in an attempt to stop the crisis in Greece and the conflicts between EAM and non-EAM forces (a prelude of the civil war) and establish a national unity government.

Liberation of Greece and the Dekemvrianá events

After the evacuation of Greece by the Axis powers, he entered Athens (October 1944) as Prime Minister of the Greek government-in-exile with some units of the Greek Army and the allied British. He tried to normalise the highly polarised situation between the EAM and non-EAM forces, collaborating mainly with Lieutenant-General Sir Ronald Scobie, who was, after the Caserta agreement, responsible for all the Allied forces.

Although he resigned in 1945, after the Dekemvriana events, he continued to hold high office. From 1946–1952 he served as labour minister, supplies minister, education minister, finance minister and public order minister. In 1950–1952, he was also deputy prime minister.

The 1952–1961 period was a very difficult one for Papandreou. The liberal political forces in the Kingdom of Greece were gravely weakened by internal disputes and suffered electoral defeat from the conservatives. Papandreou continuously accused Sofoklis Venizelos for these maladies, considering his leadership dour and uninspiring.

Founder of the Centre Union and later confrontation with the Palace
In 1961, Papandreou revived Greek liberalism by founding the Centre Union Party, a confederation of old liberal Venizelists, social democrats and dissatisfied conservatives. After the elections of "violence and fraud" of 1961, Papandreou declared a "Relentless Struggle" against the right-wing ERE and the "parakrátos" (deep state) of the right.

Finally, his party won the elections of November 1963 and those of 1964, the second with a landslide majority. His progressive policies as premier aroused much opposition in conservative circles, as did the prominent role played by his son Andreas Papandreou, whose policies were seen as being considerably left of center. Andreas disagreed with his father on many important issues, and developed a network of political organizations, the Democratic Leagues (Dimokratikoi Syndesmoi) to lobby for more progressive policies. He also managed to take control of the Center Union's youth organization, EDIN.

Papandreou had opposed the Zürich and London Agreement, which led to the foundation of the Republic of Cyprus. Following clashes between the Greek and Turkish communities, his government sent a Greek army division to the island.

King Constantine II openly opposed Papandreou's government, and there were frequent ultra-rightist plots in the Army, which destabilised the government. Finally, the King engineered a split in the Centre Union, and in July 1965, in a crisis known as the Apostasia or Iouliana, he dismissed the government following a dispute over control of the Ministry of Defence.

After the April 1967 military coup by the Colonels' junta led by George Papadopoulos, Papandreou was arrested. Papandreou died under house arrest in November 1968. His funeral became the occasion for a massive anti-dictatorship demonstration. He is interred at the First Cemetery of Athens, alongside his son Andreas.

Legacy

Papandreou was regarded as one of the best orators in the Greek political scene and a persistent fighter for Democracy. During the junta and after his death he was often referred to affectionately as "ο Γέρος της Δημοκρατίας" (o Géros tis Dimokratías, the old man of Democracy). Since his grandson George A. Papandreou entered politics, most Greek writers use Γεώργιος (Geórgios) to refer to the grandfather and the less formal Γιώργος (Giórgos) to refer to the grandson.

Works
The Liberation of Greece, Athens, 1945

Decorations and awards
In 1965, the University of Belgrade awarded him an honorary doctorate.

See also
Andreas Papandreou, his son
George Papandreou, his grandson

References

Further reading
 Kassimeris, Christos. "Causes of the 1967 Greek coup." Democracy and Security 2#1 (2006): 61–72.
 Wilsford, David, ed. Political leaders of contemporary Western Europe: a biographical dictionary (Greenwood, 1995) pp. 346–75.

External links

 

 
1888 births
1968 deaths
20th-century prime ministers of Greece
People from Achaea
George 01
Liberal Party (Greece) politicians
Democratic Socialist Party of Greece politicians
National Political Union (1946) politicians
Georgios Papandreou Party politicians
Greek Rally politicians
Liberal Democratic Union (Greece) politicians
Centre Union politicians
Prime Ministers of Greece
Deputy Prime Ministers of Greece
Foreign ministers of Greece
Government ministers of Greece
Greek MPs 1924–1925
Greek MPs 1926–1928
Greek MPs 1928–1932
Greek MPs 1932–1933
Greek MPs 1933–1935
Greek MPs 1946–1950
Greek MPs 1950–1951
Greek MPs 1952–1956
Greek MPs 1956–1958
MPs of Achaea
MPs of Lesbos
Greek nationalists
World War II political leaders
Prisoners and detainees of Greece
Greek people of World War II
Greek Resistance members
European democratic socialists
Greek anti-communists
1950s in Greek politics
1960s in Greek politics
20th-century Greek lawyers
Burials at the First Cemetery of Athens
Grand Crosses 1st class of the Order of Merit of the Federal Republic of Germany
Republicanism in Greece